RNA, 5S cluster 1, also known as RN5S1@, is a human gene encoding the 5S subunit of ribosomal RNA.

References

Further reading

Genes on human chromosome